The Macedonian Orthodox Church is an autocephalous Eastern Orthodox church in North Macedonia.

The term Macedonian Orthodox Church may also refer to:
 , a True Orthodox Church
 Orthodox Ohrid Archbishopric, an autonomous archbishopric under the jurisdiction of the Serbian Orthodox Church
 Metropolis of Thessaloniki, an Eastern Orthodox diocese in Greek Macedonia

See also 
 Archbishopric of Ohrid (disambiguation)
 Macedonia (disambiguation)
 Macedonian (disambiguation)
 Orthodox Church (disambiguation)